Devil in the Flesh is a 1947 French romantic drama film directed by Claude Autant-Lara, based on the 1923 novel of the same name by Raymond Radiguet. The film stars Micheline Presle and Gérard Philipe, with Palau, Jean Varas, Jacques Tati, Denise Grey and Jean Debucourt in supporting roles.

The film's sets were designed by the art director Max Douy.

Premise
In France during World War I, nurse Marthe waits for her husband, Jacques, while he fights on the front lines. The lonely Marthe begins a tempestuous affair with 17-year-old François, with whom she had a dalliance before marrying Jacques. Jealous François struggles with the fact that Marthe is married, while she tries to prove her devotion to her young, hotheaded lover. Things become even more complex when Marthe becomes pregnant with François' baby.

Cast
 Micheline Presle as Marthe Grangier
 Gérard Philipe as François Jaubert
 Denise Grey as Madame Grangier
 Jean Debucourt as Monsieur Jaubert
 Palau as Monsieur Marin
 Jean Varas as Jacques Lacombe
 Michel François as Rene
 Richard Francoeur as the receptionist
 Max Maxudian as the principal
 Germaine Ledoyen as Madame Jaubert
 Jeanne Pérez as Madame Marin
 Jacques Tati as officer

Accolades
In the United States the National Board of Review of Motion Pictures named it the fifth best film of 1949.

References

External links

 
 
 

1947 films
1947 romantic drama films
Adultery in films
Films directed by Claude Autant-Lara
Films based on French novels
Films based on romance novels
Films shot at Boulogne Studios
Films with screenplays by Jean Aurenche
Films with screenplays by Pierre Bost
French black-and-white films
French romantic drama films
French World War I films
1940s French films